West Bengal State University (WBSU) is a public university situated in Berunanpukuria, North 24 Paraganas, West Bengal, India. It was established by an Act of the Legislative Assembly on 2007.

History
The Government of West Bengal through an Act of the Legislative Assembly has passed West Bengal Act XXVIII, 2007 implementing a long-standing public demand in creating the university named West Bengal State University at Barasat, North 24 Paraganas. This became functional from the academic session 2008–09. On 26 May 2008, there were 63 colleges formerly affiliated with the University of Calcutta. They were, through a government notification (No.300-Edn (U)/ IU-38/08), transferred to this new university.
The University began functioning under its first Vice-Chancellor Ashoke Ranjan Thakur, the erstwhile Pro-Vice-Chancellor of Jadavpur University.

Campus and Location

The university is located in very quiet place, free of crowd, at a remote village named Berunanpukuria, which is located in the North 24 Parganas district, 7 km off Barasat city (the district headquarters of North 24 Parganas), North 24 Paraganas, West Bengal, India.

Organization and Administration

Governance
The Governor of West Bengal is the ex-officio Chancellor of the university while the Vice-chancellor of the university is the chief executive officer of the university. In 2021 Mahua Das was appointed as Vice-chancellor of the university.

Faculties and Departments
West Bengal State University has 30 departments organized into three faculty councils.

 Faculty of Science

This faculty consists of the departments of Anthropology, Mathematics, Physics, Chemistry, Computer Science, Biochemistry, Psychology, Geography, Rural Studies, Electronics, Food and Nutrition, Microbiology, Statistics, Economics, Botany, Zoology, and Physiology.

 Faculty of Arts

This faculty council consists of the departments of Bengali, English, Hindi, Sanskrit, Urdu, Arabic, History, Political Science, Philosophy, Education, Sociology, Library Science, Flim Studies, and Journalism.

 Faculty of Commerce and Management

This faculty consists of the departments of  Commerce and Business Administration.

Affliations
The university is an affiliating institution. All the 55 colleges (including Undergraduate, Postgraduate and B.Ed.) in the district of North 24 Parganas, which were formerly affiliated with the University of Calcutta, are affiliated to this university.  the university has 49 affiliated colleges and 5 B.Ed. colleges. Out of 49 colleges, eight are NAAC accredited A-grade colleges and 19 colleges offer Postgraduate courses.

Academics

Admission
One can take admission in the undergraduate course of the university based on their results in the higher secondary (10+2) examination. For admission in the postgraduate courses and doctoral degree courses, one has to take an entrance exam (written test/interview) given by the university or any national level exam related to the subject, held by the University Grants Commission.

Library
The University has a library on the first floor of its main building with an internet facility.
This library is usually called as "Central library of WBSU". The recent Librarian is Dr. Sushanta Banerjee. The central library maintains various subjects like, 

 Number of books - 29000 (approx)
 Number of journals - 20 (approx)
 Number of reference books - 500 (approx)

Accreditation
The University is recognized by the University Grants Commission (U.G.C.) in terms of Section 12B of the U.G.C. Act. The university received accreditation from National Assessment and Accreditation Council (NAAC) on 23rd February 2021.

Gallery

See also
 List of universities in West Bengal

References

External links

Official website
Official Website

 
Universities and colleges in North 24 Parganas district
Barasat
Educational institutions established in 2008
2008 establishments in West Bengal